Chrisnovic Isemoli N'sa (born 28 January 1999) is a Canadian professional soccer player who plays for Huntsville City FC in MLS Next Pro.

Early life
N'sa began playing youth soccer at age nine with AS Concordia. Afterwards, he played for CS Panellinios. In 2016, he joined the Montreal Impact Academy, where he played for two years, before departing in 2018, after he aged out of the program.

Club career
In 2018, he joined CS Longueuil in the Première ligue de soccer du Québec.

In February 2019, N'sa signed his first professional contract with Canadian Premier League side HFX Wanderers. In December 2019, N'sa re-signed with Wanderers for the 2020 season. He was only one of seven returning players for the side in 2020, from the 2019 season. He helped the Wanderers reach the 2020 CPL Championship final, where they were defeated by Forge FC. After the 2020 season, he was nominated for the CPL U-21 Player of the Year award. 

In November 2020, N'sa signed with York United, joining his brother Felix who had signed with the club the day before. He declined an extension from the Wanderers, as well as offers from other CPL clubs and foreign clubs in order to sign with York. He made his debut for York in their 2021 season opener against Cavalry FC on June 27, 2021. N'Sa scored his first goal for York on October 24 against Atlético Ottawa. After the end of the season, York exercised his club option for the 2022 season. In December 2022, York revealed they could not agree to terms over a new contract, and that N'Sa would be departing the club.

In February 2023, he joined Huntsville City FC in MLS Next Pro.

International career
In 2014, he made his debut in the Canadian youth program at an identification camp for the Canada U15 team.

In 2017, he was called up to a Quebec-Canada U20 team to play friendlies against Haiti U20, who were preparing for the 2017 Jeux de la Francophonie. He was then named to the Quebéc U20 team for the 2017 Jeux de la Francophonie.

Personal life
His younger brother, Felix, is also a professional soccer player. N'sa has a big presence on the social media app TikTok, with him being nicknamed 'Tik Tok Man' by his HFX Wanderers coach Stephen Hart.

References

External links

  
 

1999 births
Living people
Association football defenders
Canadian soccer players
Soccer players from Montreal
Black Canadian soccer players
Canadian people of Democratic Republic of the Congo descent
Francophone Quebec people
HFX Wanderers FC players
York United FC players
Canadian Premier League players
CS Longueuil players
Première ligue de soccer du Québec players
CF Montréal players